Stuart William Roberts (born 25 March 1967) was a Welsh footballer who played in the English Football League for Stoke City.

Career
Roberts was born in Chirk and played with Oswestry Town in the Welsh league, impressing enough to earn a move to First Division side Stoke City as a teenager. He made his Football League debut on 8 December 1984 against Ipswich Town becoming Stoke City's youngest goalkeeper at the age of 17 years, 258 days. Stoke lost 2–0 and Roberts played in four more matches during a woeful 1984–85 campaign which saw them relegated with a record low points tally. At the end of the season he was released and joined Irish club Derry City. He spent two seasons at the Brandywell Stadium and won the League of Ireland First Division in 1986–87. His last game was the 1988 FAI Cup Final.

Career statistics

Honours
Derry City
 League of Ireland First Division champions: 1986–87

References

Welsh footballers
Stoke City F.C. players
Derry City F.C. players
League of Ireland players
Association football goalkeepers
Oswestry Town F.C. players
English Football League players
1967 births
Living people
People from Chirk
Sportspeople from Wrexham County Borough